Dalian railway station is a railway station of the Harbin–Dalian section of the Beijing–Harbin High-Speed Railway. It is located in Zhongshan District, Dalian, Liaoning, China.

History

The station opened in 1903. The new station was constructed and moved to the current location in 1937.

See also
 Russian Dalian
 Chinese Eastern Railway
 South Manchuria Railway
 Lüshun railway station
 Trams in Dalian
 Line 3 (Dalian Metro)
 Line 5 (Dalian Metro)

References

External links

 Dalian Railway Station Official website 

Railway stations in Liaoning
Railway stations in China opened in 1903
Rail transport in Dalian
Railway stations in Dalian